These are the list of programs broadcast by GMA News TV International.

The programming of GMA News TV International consists mostly of shows from the Philippines from GMA Network, GMA News TV & GMA Regional TV as well as previously aired shows, documentaries, films, and sports events from the Philippines.

Currently broadcast

GMA News TV International

From GMA Regional TV

Flagship Newscasts
 Balitang Amianan (2013 – present) (North Central Luzon); new episodes & some are replays/ encore telecast (Delivered in Filipino Language) Anchored by: CJ Torida, Joanne Ponsoy, and Harold Reyes.
 Balitang Bisdak (2013 - present) (Central and Eastern Visayas); new episodes & some are replays/ encore telecast (Delivered in Cebuano Language) Anchored by:  Alan Domingo, Lou Anne Mae Rondina, and Cecille Quibod Castro.
 One Western Visayas (2018 – present) (Western Visayas); new episodes & some are replays/ encore telecast (Delivered in Hiligaynon Language) Anchored by: Adrian Prietos Together with Co-Anchors are Kaitlene Rivilla and Juan Miguel Dela Cena.
 One Mindanao (2013 – present) (Northern Western South Central and Southern Mindanao); new episodes & some are replays/ encore telecast (Delivered in Cebuano Language) Anchored by: Sarah Hilomen Velasco, Together with Co-Anchors are Jandi Esteban, Rgil Relator, and Cyril Chaves.
 Balitang Southern Tagalog (2022 – present) (Southern Tagalog); new episodes & some are replays/ encore telecast (Delivered in Filipino Language) Anchored by: Ivy Saunar-Gasang and Ace Medrano
 Balitang Bicolandia (2021 – present) (Bicol Region); new episodes & some are replays/ encore telecast (Delivered in Bicolano Language) Anchored by: Jessie Cruzat Together with Co-Anchor Kate Delovieres.
 Regional TV News [Formerly as Regional TV Weekend News] (2021 - present) (National and All Other Countries); new episodes & some are replays/ encore telecast (Delivered in Tagalog Language) Anchored by Various GMA Regional TV Newscast Anchors.

Morning Programs
 Mornings with GMA Regional TV (2020 - present) (North Central Luzon); new episodes and some are replays/ encore telecast (Delivered in Filipino Language) 
Hosted by: CJ Torida and Harold Reyes.
 GMA Regional TV Live! (2020 - present) (Central and Eastern Visayas); new episodes and some are replays/ encore telecast (Delivered in Cebuano Language)
Hosted by: Nikko Sereno and Cecille Quibod-Castro.
 GMA Regional TV Early Edition (2020 - present) (Western Visayas); new episodes and some are replays/ encore telecast (Delivered in Hiligaynon Language)
Hosted by: Adrian Prietos, and Kaitline Rivilla. 
 At Home with GMA Regional TV (2020 - present) (South Central Western and North Central Mindanao); new episodes and some replays/ encore telecast (Delivered in Cebuano Language)
Hosted by: Jandi Esteban, and Cyril Chaves Together with Abby Caballero of GMA Davao, Efren Mamac of GMA Zamboanga and Jestoni Jumamil of GMA General Santos.

Re-aired from GMA Network

Travelogue
Born Impact: Born to Be Wild Weekend Edition [2013 - 2014 (GMA Network); 2014 - present (GMA News TV International)]; re-runs; some are replays/ encore telecast.

Presently Aired from GMA News TV

News programs
  State of the Nation with Jessica Soho [2011–present (GMA News TV), 2011 – present (GMA News TV International)]; new episodes & some are replays/ encore telecast
  Balita Pilipinas Ngayon [2011 – present (GMA News TV), 2011 – present (GMA News TV International)];; new episodes & some are replays/ encore telecast
  News TV Quick Response Team [2011 – present (GMA News TV), 2011 – present (GMA News TV International)];; new episodes & some are replays/ encore telecast
  Dobol B sa News TV [2011–present (GMA News TV), 2017 – present (GMA News TV International)];; new episodes
  News to Go [2011–2019 (GMA News TV), 2011 – present (GMA News TV International)];; new episodes & some are replays/ encore telecast
  Good News Kasama si Vicky Morales [2011 – present (GMA News TV), 2011–present (GMA News TV International)];; new episodes & some are replays/ encore telecast

Documentary
 Reel Time [2011 – present (GMA News TV); 2011 – present (GMA News TV International)];  new episodes & some are replays/ encore telecast
 i-Witness [1999 – present (GMA Network); 2011 – present (GMA News TV International)];  new episodes & some are replays/ encore telecast
 Tonight with Arnold Clavio [2010 – 2011 (GMA Network); 2011 – present (GMA News TV International)];  new episodes & some are replays/ encore telecast
 iJuander [2011 – present (GMA News TV); 2011 – present (GMA News TV International)];  new episodes & some are replays/ encore telecast
 Brigada [2011 – present (GMA News TV); 2011 – present (GMA News TV International)];  new episodes & some are replays/ encore telecast
 Motorcycle Diaries [2011 – 2017 (GMA News TV); 2017 – present (GMA News TV International)];  new episodes & some are replays/ encore telecast

Informative
 Agri Preneur [2017 – present (GMA News TV), 2017 – present (GMA News TV International)]; new episodes & some are replays/ encore telecast
 Turbo Zone, Feed Your Drive! [2012 – present (GMA News TV); 2012 – present (GMA News TV International)]; new episodes & some are replays/ encore telecast

Lifestyle
 Power House [2011 – 2014 (GMA News TV); 2014 – 2016 (GMA Network); 2016 – present (GMA News TV International); new episodes & some are replays/ encore telecast

Public Affairs
 Bawal ang Pasaway kay Mareng Winnie (2011 – present (GMA News TV); 2011 – present (GMA News TV International); new episodes & some are replays/ encore telecast
 Alisto (2013 – present (GMA Network); 2013 – present (GMA News TV International); new episodes & some are replays/ encore telecast
 Biyaheng DO30 (2016 – present (GMA Network/GMA Regional TV); 2016 – present (GMA News TV International); new episodes & some are replays/ encore telecast
 Investigative Documentaries (2011 – present (GMA News TV); 2011 – present (GMA News TV International); new episodes & some are replays/ encore telecast

Sports
 National Basketball League (Philippines) (also aired on Basketball TV & Solar Sports in the Philippines); new episodes & some are replays/ encore telecast

Re-aired programs from QTV (now GMA News TV)
 Tonight with Arnold Clavio (2010 – 2011 (Q); 2011 – present (GMA News TV); 2011 – present (GMA News TV International);  new episodes & some are replays/ encore telecast

See also
 GMA News TV
 GMA Life TV
 GMA Pinoy TV

Lists of television series by network